The 2001–2002 Sparta Rotterdam season was the football year in The Netherlands in which the club from Rotterdam was relegated for the first time in its history to the Eerste Divisie. The team had to play in the play-offs for promotion and relegation ("nacompetitie") after having finished in 17th place in the Eredivisie.

Matches

Eredivisie

Final Table

Nacompetitie

Amstel Cup

Players

|-
|}

See also
2001–02 in Dutch football

External links
Results
RSSSF
Voetbal International
Sparta Info
footballdatabase

Sparta Rotterdam seasons
Sparta Rotterdam